The Chevrolet Tele-Theatre is an American anthology series that aired live on NBC Mondays at 8 pm EST from September 27, 1948 to June 26, 1950. The program presented both news headlines and live dramatic performances of either original plays or works adapted for television from the stage. Sometimes the show was referred to as Chevrolet on Broadway or The Broadway Playhouse; particularly when the program was presenting an adapted stage work from New York City's theatre scene.

The sponsor was Chevrolet, an automobile division of General Motors. Beginning with the January 4, 1949, episode, the Chevrolet Central Office of General Motors was the sponsor, replacing Chevrolet dealers' groups.

Production
Vic McLeod produced the program. Barry Bernard and Garry Simpson were the directors. The program originated from WNBT.

Effective January 24, 1949, the program was moved to the 8:30-9 p.m. Eastern Time slot on Mondays. That change allowed it to be shown live in the Midwest, via use of coaxial cable, rather than just in the East as had been the case in its previous time slot (30 minutes earlier on Mondays). The change meant that it was shown simultaneously on 12 NBC stations.

Critical reception 
A review of the January 31, 1949, broadcast in the trade publication Variety called the episode "a neat comedy playlet" that featured "sharp lines snappily rendered by two vet thespers". It also complimented the way the one-act play was adapted for television.

Episode status
 
One episode from October 1949 is stored at the Library of Congress, along with three other episodes from that year, plus an episode from 1950. There are five kinescope recordings of 1948 programs also archived at Library of Congress, and an interview with one of the people involved in the production appears on the Archives of American Television Web Site. However, these aging 69+ year old kinescope film prints have yet to be transferred to modern media to ensure the survival of the episodes.

Episodes

Guest stars
Jonathan Harris's TV debut came on The Chevrolet Tele-Theatre in the 1949 episode "His Name Is Jason".

Other actors who appeared in the series included: 

Eddie Albert
Don Ameche
Mischa Auer
Fay Bainter
Bertha Belmore
Gertrude Berg
Elizabeth Bergner
John Carradine
Leo G. Carroll

Jackie Cooper
Hume Cronyn
Brian Donlevy
Faye Emerson
Nanette Fabray
Nina Foch
Dick Foran
Will Geer
Rex Harrison

Edward Everett Horton
Dean Jagger
Boris Karloff
Guy Kibbee
Canada Lee
Paul Lukas
E.G. Marshall
Mercedes McCambridge
Paul Muni

Barry Nelson
Luise Rainer
Basil Rathbone
Charles Ruggles
Margaret Sullavan
Arthur Treacher
Ernest Truex
Forrest Tucker

See also
1948-49 United States network television schedule
1949-50 United States network television schedule
Sham - Play which was adapted as an episode of the series

References

External links
The Chevrolet Tele-Theatre at CVTA with episode list
 

1948 American television series debuts
1950 American television series endings
1940s American anthology television series
1950s American anthology television series
1940s American drama television series
1950s American drama television series
Black-and-white American television shows
American live television series
English-language television shows
NBC original programming
Chevrolet